The Cathedral Basilica of Our Lady of the Assumption , also called Santiago de Cuba Cathedral, is a Roman Catholic cathedral and minor basilica in Santiago de Cuba, in eastern Cuba. The cathedral fronts onto Céspedes Park. Its facade has two marble sculptures.

The first church in Santiago was built in 1514, at the beginning of the Spanish colonization of Cuba, and dedicated to Saint Catherine. This was a small, rudimentary chapel on a hill, the future site of the provincial prison. In 1522, this parish church, called Ermita de Santa Catalina, was elevated to the status of cathedral by Pope Adrian VI. Its construction ended in 1526. It was destroyed in the earthquakes of 1678, 1766, 1852 and 1932. In 1882 it received the title of minor basilica from the Holy See. It became a national monument of Cuba in 1958.

In the late 19th century, Juan Perpiñan y Pibernat presided over the Sacrament of Penance at the cathedral by royal decree from Spain.

See also
Roman Catholic Archdiocese of Santiago de Cuba
Roman Catholicism in Cuba

References

Roman Catholic cathedrals in Cuba
Buildings and structures in Santiago de Cuba
Roman Catholic churches completed in 1514
Basilica churches in Cuba
16th-century Roman Catholic church buildings in Cuba